Ngarchelong is a state in Palau. Ngarchelong is at the northernmost tip of the island of Babeldaob. Only the state of Kayangel is farther north.

Demography 
The population of the state was 316 in the 2015 census and median age was 37.2 years. The official languages of the state are Palauan and English. Uongerchetei is the title of the traditional high chief from the state. 

The state has a population of slightly under 320 people, making it the seventh most populated of Palau's sixteen states, although it is ranked thirteenth in land (with only about 10 square kilometers). The village of Mengellang serves as the state capital, and lies toward the south of the state. Mengellang and Ollei are the state's main population centers.

Geography 
Ngerchelong is situated on the northern tip of Babeldaob Island. The land has low rolling hills with short drainages and is fringed by a thick belt mangroves. Ngerchelong extends north from the narrowest part of the neck on Babeldaob where it borders Ngaraard. Lower hillsides are generally covered with a lowland forest, and some of the higher hills at the north end of the state are forested, but much of the land is covered with grass and low scrub.

The modern villages of Ollei (north), Mengellang (southwest) and Ngerbau (east coast) are connected by a road now partially paved. This road will eventually become part of the Babeldaob Road connecting to Chol in Ngaraard. 

Presently, most of the land use in Ngerchelong is confined to gardens surrounding the modern villages. Interspersed with these kitchen gardens are stands of agroforest which include coconut, and betelnut, breadfruit, almond trees, and banana plants. In and around many of the uninhabited villages are stands of coconut and betelnut palms, and occasionally patches of irregularly attended taro swamp gardens.

In addition, Ngerchelong includes two small islands, Ngerkeklau and Ngerechur, located one and two kilometers north of Babeldaob.

Traditional villages 
At least nine traditional village sites lie within Ngerchelong. The traditional villages represent important symbols giving identity to families, clans, and regions. Within villages are numerous stone features with historical and traditional importance. Many of the stone platforms, odesongel, serve as clan cemeteries, and other stone features serve as shrines. The lagoon is an important resource area, and was probably intensively exploited prehistorically. Important resources include the many fish species. Near the traditional villages are taro swamp gardens, and surrounding most village sites are garden plots and terraced hillsides.

Political system
The state of Ngarchelong, with population of less than 350, has an elected chief executive, governor. The state also has a legislature elected every two years. The state population elects one of the member in the House of Delegates of Palau.

Culture 
Ngarchelong is an important historical site and has undergone archeological excavation.

Ngarchelong is the site of ancient stone monoliths which are mysterious in origin.  Traditional Palaun religion regarded these stone monoliths as sacred prayer ground.  There are other stone monoliths located in and around the islands but one will not see as many as there are in Ngarchelong.

Education
The Ministry of Education operates public schools.

Ngarchelong Elementary School, established in 1947, moved to its current site in Bai ra Mengellang from the original site in the community bai of Yebong hamlet in 1953. Its current building opened in 1964. It served students from Choll. Ngaraard Elementary School in Ngaraard formerly served Ngarchelong.

Palau High School in Koror is the country's only public high school, so children from this community go there.

References 

 
States of Palau